Cyberchase: Castleblanca Quest is a computer game developed by Canadian studio Basis Applied Technology and published by The Learning Company and based on the Cyberchase edutainment TV series. The game was released in 2003.

Summary
The game's features include: eight activities, video footage and full screen animation, a "tracking feature" that lets parents monitor progress, adventure and practice modes, and three levels of difficulty.

Critical reception
USA Today wrote "Cyberchase Castleblanca Quest isn't nearly as good as Cyberchase Carnival Chaos", adding "The story line in Cyberchase Castleblanca Quest is difficult to follow. It is presented in a very grainy video that is too brief". Common Sense Media gave the game a rating of 2/5 stars, writing "Parents need to know that a hard-to-follow storyline and inadequate directions make this software difficult to play". Techwithkids gave the game 3/5 stars, writing "If you have Cyberchase fans, play Cyberchase Carnival Chaos and skip this one".

References

Children's educational video games
Video games based on television series
Video games developed in Canada
2003 video games
MacOS games
Windows games
The Learning Company games